Desmarais is a French surname, associated especially but not exclusively with a powerful business and political family in Canada and United States. Notable people with the surname include:

 André Desmarais (born 1956), Canadian businessman
 Charles Desmarais, president of the San Francisco Art Institute 
 France Chrétien Desmarais, Canadian lawyer and businesswoman, daughter of Jean Chrétien and wife of André Desmarais
 François-Séraphin Régnier-Desmarais (1632–1713), French ecclesiastic, grammarian, diplomat and poet
 Hélène Desmarais (born 1955), Canadian businesswoman, spouse of Paul Desmarais Jr.
 James Desmarais (born 1979), Canadian professional ice hockey player 
 Jean Noël Desmarais (1924–1995), Canadian physician, radiologist, and politician and brother of Louis Desmarais
 Lorraine Desmarais (born 1956), Canadian jazz pianist and composer
 Louis Desmarais (born 1923), member of the Canadian House of Commons from 1979-1984
Louis-Élie Desmarais, partner in 19th century Canadian photography studio Desmarais et Cie 
 Ludger Desmarais, professional ice hockey player from 1926–1939
 Marcel-Marie Desmarais (1908–1994), Quebec writer, preacher and broadcaster
 Mathurin Desmarais (1653-1700), French pirate and buccaneer
 Odilon Desmarais (1854–1904), Quebec lawyer, judge and politician
 Ovide E. Desmarais (1919–1998), American author of books and detective stories
Ovila Desmarais, partner in 19th century Canadian photography studio Desmarais et Cie
 Paul Desmarais (1927–2013), Canadian billionaire and CEO of the Power Corporation of Canada 
 Paul Desmarais Jr. (born 1954), Canadian businessman, son of Paul Desmarais, and chairman of Power Corporation of Canada 
 Pierre DesMarais, Canadian politician and Chairman of Montreal's Executive Committee 1954-1957

See also
Marais (disambiguation)

French-language surnames